Taylor Dent won the title by the score of 7–6(9), 7–6(4) in the final over Wayne Odesnik.

Seeds

Draw

Final four

Top half

Bottom half

References
 Main Draw
 Qualifying Draw

2009 ATP Challenger Tour
2009 Singles